The Turner T-40 is a wooden, single-seat, homebuilt aircraft that was designed by Eugene L. "Gene" Turner, first flying on 3 April 1961 (his birthday).

Design and development
The T-40 was designed to be a simple to build, all wood aircraft with folding wings. The prototype was modified several times from a single-seat aircraft to a two-place. It also was modified with a bubble canopy and for one flight only, canard control surfaces.

The T-40 has conventional landing gear. The canopy on the original T-40 single seat version was modeled using the NACA X-2 canopy as a guide. The majority of the wood used for structural components is Douglas fir. The wing and fuselage skins are plywood. The fuel tank is made of fiberglass. For control an all flying tail is used with anti-servo tabs. The dual spar, laminar flow wings can be folded for storage.

Operational history
The prototype T-40, named "Ophelia Bumps", won the 1961 EAA Outstanding Design Award, second place in the 1962 EAA Design Competition, the Lockheed-Marietta Georgia Award for Outstanding Workmanship, the EAA Outstanding Canopy Design Trophy The prototype is now on display at the Saxon Aerospace Museum in Boron, California.

Variants
Turner T-40
Original version
Turner T-40A
A two seat variant with conventional landing gear.
Turner T-40B
A two seat variant with tricycle landing gear.
Super" Turner T-40AS
Bubble canopy 125hp 
Turner T-77
T-40 with bubble canopy and swept tail.

Specifications (T-40)

References

Homebuilt aircraft